The Hepatophrenic ligament is a ligament connecting the liver to the diaphragm.

It is sometimes considered part of the lesser omentum. It is also sometimes considered part of the coronary ligament. However, it is not a term used by most anatomy resources.

References

External links
  - "Stomach, Spleen and Liver: Ligaments"
 

Abdomen
Ligaments